L.E.D? are an English Christian music quartet, who plays electropop from a Christian pop, Christian EDM, Christian R&B, and Christian hip hop perspective and worldview, while they are from Cornwall, England. They have released one studio album, Jericho in 2015, and three extended plays before that, Just Dance in 2011, Flip the Switch in 2013, and Re:MIXD in 2014.

Background
L.E.D? are a Christian pop, Christian EDM, Christian R&B, and Christian hip hop group from Cornwall, England. Their members are Chris Uglow, Nikki Uglow, Rich Smith, and Jon Alford.

Music history
They started as a musical entity in 2010, with their first extended play, Just Dance, that released in 2011. Their subsequent extended play, Flip the Switch, was released on 5 August 2013. The third extended play, Re:MIXD, was released on 2 August 2014. Their first studio album, Jericho, was released on 27 April 2015.

Members
Current members
 Jon Alford
 Chris Uglow
 Nikki Uglow
 Rich Smith

Discography
Studio Albums
Jericho (27 April 2015)
EPs
Just Dance (2011)
Flip the Switch (5 August 2013)
Re:MIXD (3 August 2014)

References

External links
Official website
Louder Than the Music profile

English Christian musical groups
English Christian rock groups
English dance music groups
English electronic music groups
English hip hop groups
English pop music groups
Musical groups established in 2010
2010 establishments in England